Tamás Vicsek (born 10 May 1948, Budapest) is a Hungarian scientist with research interests in numerical studies of dense liquids, percolation theory, Monte Carlo simulation of cluster models, aggregation phenomena, fractal growth, pattern formation (computer and laboratory experiments), collective phenomena in biological systems (flocking, oscillations, crowds), molecular motors, cell locomotion in vitro. He held the position of  professor of physics at the Eötvös Loránd University, Budapest, Hungary, and was visiting scientists in various academia.

He is the namesake of the Vicsek fractal and the Vicsek model of swarm behavior.

He earned M.Sc. from the Lomonosov University, Moscow in 1972 and PhD from Lajos Kossuth University (current University of Debrecen) in 1976.

Awards and recognition
1990 Award of the Hungarian Academy of Sciences 
1999 Széchenyi Prize 
2003 Leo Szilard Award (:hu:Szilárd Leó professzori ösztöndíj) 
2006 Fellow of the American Physical Society
2020 Lars Onsager Prize (US)

References

1948 births
Living people
20th-century Hungarian physicists
20th-century Hungarian mathematicians
Hungarian biologists
Academic staff of Eötvös Loránd University
University of Debrecen alumni 
Moscow State University alumni
21st-century Hungarian physicists